The 34th Australian Film Institute Awards (generally known as the AFI Awards) were held at the World Congress Centre in Melbourne on 16 October 1992.  Presented by the Australian Film Institute (AFI), the awards celebrated the best in Australian feature film, documentary, short film and television productions of 1992.

Feature film Strictly Ballroom received eight awards including Best Film. Romper Stomper won three and The Last Days of Chez Nous and Black Robe each won a single award.  Miniseries Brides of Christ won four awards for television including Best Television Mini Series or Telefeature.  Director and producer Lee Robinson received the Raymond Longford Award for lifetime achievement.

Winners and nominees
Winners are listed first and highlighted in boldface.

Feature film

Non-feature film

Additional awards

Television

References

External links
 The Australian Film Institute | Australian Academy of Cinema and Television Arts official website

AACTA Awards ceremonies
AACTA Awards
AACTA Awards
AACTA Awards
AACTA Awards